Beacon Mill is the name of a number of windmills.

Beacon Mill may be:-

Beacon Mill, Benenden, Kent
Beacon Mill, Rottingdean, Sussex